This is an index of Microsoft Windows games.

This list has been split into multiple pages.

Windows